The Cal Poly Pomona College of Engineering is the engineering college at California State Polytechnic University, Pomona (Cal Poly Pomona or Cal Poly) located in Pomona, California, United States. Known  for its "learn by doing" philosophy, the college's motto is: "Learn by Doing: Making Imagination Real". Cal Poly has one of the "most recognized engineering programs in the country" and, with nearly 6,000 students (as of 2019), it is also the largest engineering college in Southern California, the second largest college of engineering in the California State University system, and the seventeenth largest engineering college in the United States.  In the 2022 U.S. News & World Report "America's Best Colleges" edition, the College of Engineering is ranked 10th out of 210 public and private undergraduate engineering schools in the U.S. where doctorates are not offered.

The College of Engineering at Cal Poly Pomona is among the most selective engineering colleges in the nation. For fall 2018, the college admitted 45.3 percent of its total freshmen applicants who held an average unweighted GPA of 3.74 (out of 4.00) and SATs of 1249 (out of 1600).

History

Engineering classes at the Kellogg Campus in Pomona, California of the California Polytechnic began in academic year 1957-58. At the time, the Engineering Center (the current two-story portion of Building 9) had not been finalized and it took two more years, until 1959, to complete. The first class of the College of Engineering graduated in 1960 with 11 graduates in the disciplines of Aeronautical Engineering, Electronic Engineering, Industrial Engineering and Mechanical Engineering.

It is accredited by the Engineering Accreditation Commission of ABET, Inc. (formerly the Accreditation Board for Engineering and Technology) for its baccalaureate programs in aerospace engineering, civil engineering, chemical and materials engineering, electrical and computer engineering, industrial engineering, manufacturing engineering, and mechanical engineering. It is also accredited by the Technology Accreditation Commission of ABET for its baccalaureate programs in construction engineering technology, and electromechanical engineering technology. The baccalaureate program in agricultural engineering is also accredited by ABET, yet this program is housed by the College of Agriculture. The Department of Chemical & Materials Engineering was formed in 1972 and is accredited by the American Institute of Chemical Engineers (AIChE) in addition to ABET.

College of Engineering magazine
In 2012, the College of Engineering launched the first issue of its magazine, Xpressions of Xcellence.

Campus

Building 9 (College of Engineering)

Building 13 (engineering annex)

Building 17 (engineering laboratories)

Academics

Undergraduate programs (11)
College of Engineering Programs

Graduate programs (6)

 (CENG-Programs)

Admissions
Admissions to Cal Poly's College of Engineering are on a rolling basis along with all other colleges at the university. According to the California State University system students in engineering, technology and computer science represent the largest sector of enrollment with 23% of the student body in those areas. Also, the largest three majors by enrollment at the university are Mechanical Engineering, Civil Engineering and Electrical Engineering.

Freshmen admissions

Freshman admission rate by majors

Rankings
 1st in California: Degrees awarded to Hispanic engineers, Engineering Workforce Commission
 1st Nationally: Largest civil engineering undergraduate program, American Society for Engineering Education
 4th Nationally: Undergraduate engineering program, among public, masters-granting universities, U.S. News & World Report
 5th Nationally: Largest Hispanic engineering college, American Society for Engineering Education
5th Nationally: Largest electrical engineering undergraduate program, U.S. News & World Report
5th Nationally: Largest civil engineering undergraduate program, U.S. News & World Report
5th Nationally: Largest computer engineering undergraduate program, U.S. News & World Report
 6th Nationally: Bachelor's degrees awarded to minorities, Diverse Issues in Higher Education
 9th Nationally: Largest Asian-American engineering college, American Society for Engineering Education
12th Nationally: Largest mechanical engineering undergraduate program, U.S. News & World Report
 20th Nationally: Largest percentage of women tenure/tenure-track faculty, American Society for Engineering Education
 22nd Nationally: Largest engineering college, American Society for Engineering Education
 46th Nationally: Bachelor's degrees awarded to women, American Society for Engineering Education

See also
 Engineering
 Glossary of engineering
 Engineering colleges in California
 List of engineering programs in the California State University

References

External links
 

College of Engineering
Engineering universities and colleges in California
Engineering schools and colleges in the United States
Universities and colleges in Los Angeles County, California
Educational institutions established in 1957
1957 establishments in California
Science and technology in Greater Los Angeles